USS O'Toole (DE-527) was an  of the United States Navy during World War II. She served in the North Atlantic ocean protecting convoys and other ships from German U-boats and aircraft. She also performed escort and anti-submarine operations before returning home at the end of the conflict.

Namesake
John Albert O'Toole was born on 16 May 1916 in Boston, Massachusetts. He entered the U.S. Naval Reserve as Ensign on 7 May 1942. Assigned to  following instruction at the Naval Reserve Midshipmen's School in Chicago, Illinois, he commanded a boat wave from that transport during the assault on Fedhala, Morocco, on 8 November 1942 during Operation Torch. Killed while withdrawing from the beach, he was posthumously awarded the Navy Cross.

Construction and commissioning
O'Toole was laid down at the Boston Navy Yard on 25 September 1943, launched on 2 November 1943, and was sponsored by Mrs. John A. O'Toole, and commissioned on 22 January 1944.

World War II North Atlantic operations 
Following shakedown off Bermuda, O'Toole served as a training ship for the Fleet Sound School, Key West, Florida.  Detached on 15 July, she sailed north to Casco Bay, thence proceeded south to Norfolk, Virginia, to escort  to Recife, Brazil. Escorting  on the return voyage, she arrived at Norfolk, on 25 August, and continued on to New York City where she joined CortDiv 80 for transatlantic convoy duty.
 
On 9 September, O'Toole stood out of New York Harbor on her first escort of convoy mission. Acting as communication liaison ship between Commander, Task Group 27.5 and convoy NY 119, she shepherded the small craft convoy to the Azores, thence to Falmouth, England, arriving on 18 October. From Iceland she proceeded to Norfolk, Virginia, and New York, where she rejoined CortDiv 80. In mid-December the escort sailed with convoy UGS 64 for North Africa, returning on 23 January 1945. Completing another Mediterranean run in April, she was en route home from Algeria when the war in Europe ended.

End-of-War activity  
Arriving at New York on 23 May, she operated off the New England coast until mid-July when she proceeded to Miami, Florida, for a brief tour as school ship.  In September, she moved north, reporting for inactivation at Charleston, South Carolina, on the 10th.  Her final commander was Lt. Comdr. Lanson B. Ditto.   Decommissioned at Charleston on 18 October, she was struck from the Navy List on 1 November, and scrapped in March 1946.

References

External links

 

Evarts-class destroyer escorts
Ships built in Boston
1943 ships
World War II frigates and destroyer escorts of the United States